Milton Terrace is a heritage-listed series of terrace houses located at 1-19 Lower Fort Street, in the inner city Sydney suburb of Millers Point in the City of Sydney local government area of New South Wales, Australia. It was built from 1880 to 1882. The property was added to the New South Wales State Heritage Register on 2 April 1999.

History 
Millers Point is one of the earliest areas of European settlement in Australia, and a focus for maritime activities. This building is one of a group of ten very grand three storey Victorian terraces built during the 1880s. First tenanted by the NSW Department of Housing in 1984.

Description 

Grand three storey, five bedroom, Victorian Italianate terrace with basement, one of ten in a row. Decorative facade with large incised motifs and iron lace.

Verandah infill on second storey, deep projecting parapet, and spear fence enclosing small front garden.

Each allotment contains a four-storey residence (including basement) with front (to the east) and rear (to the west) gardens. Each terrace is accessed via an entry walkway leading from the Lower Fort Street (footpath) across the front area and front gardens. Each had two pedestrian gates, located along the front boundary and within the front gardens - these are original and should be maintained or (when missing or damaged) reconstructed/replaced. Each terrace houe is fenced separately with iron balustrade fencing to the front gardens and timber paling fencing to the rear gardens. A  photograph shows the garden setting (front) to the individual houses. By this date, many functioned as boarding houses and yet signs of middle class gentility remain. Also to the rear of a number of the allotments are located outbuildings and sheds of varying construction dates, typically used as additional storage space and laundry facilities. Some substantial trees exist within the rear gardens of the terraces, most notably in the rear of no's 1, 17 & 19 Lower Fort Street. The front gardens consist of a mix of tree and shrub plantings with little consistency in form or species selection between the individual terraces.

Storeys: Three. Construction: Painted rendered masonry, corrugated galvanised iron roof. Timber and cast iron balcony. Spear fence cast iron. Style: Victorian Italianate.

The external condition of the property is good.

Modifications and dates 
External: Verandah infill. Joinery renewed, damaged detailing.

Heritage listing 
As at 12 January 2004, this group of terraces is historically significant as:

 a significant example of continuing private investment in fine residential property in Lower Fort Street during the later 19th century and the largest such investment of the period;
 its site and buildings were associated from the early 1820s with the firm of William Walker & Co., merchants, the family and business connection continuing with later investment by Walker's son-in-law Donald Lanarch, a noted banker and businessman;
 its site of buildings and residences was associated with some of the earliest wharfage (early 1820s) at Millers Point and with merchants important in the development of commercial life in Sydney and beyond. It is also associated with Captain John Nicholson, harbour master;
 some of the houses were used from the 1890s as boarding houses and have been in use for over a century by the local community;
 it has the potential to contribute to an understanding of several phases of the development of Millers Point.

It is of aesthetic significance as:
 a very fine example of late Victorian boom style terraces on a site with landmark qualities;
 as a rare surviving example of a very grand scale terrace in the "Greek" style.

The group is of aesthetic value as a streetscape element, being an outstanding and largely intact group facing Dawes Park with spectacular harbour views to the east. With a slight change in orientation from the terraces further up the street, Milton Terrace creates a strong and handsome termination to the extraordinary collection of 19th century housing forms that make up the western side of Lower Fort Street.

Milton Terrace at 1-19 Lower Fort St represents possibly the finest extant row of 1880s terraces in Sydney.

It is part of the Millers Point Conservation Area, an intact residential and maritime precinct. It contains residential buildings and civic spaces dating from the 1830s and is an important example of 19th century adaptation of the landscape.

Milton Terrace was listed on the New South Wales State Heritage Register on 2 April 1999.

See also 

Australian residential architectural styles
21-23 Lower Fort Street

References

Bibliography

Attribution

External links

 
 

New South Wales State Heritage Register sites located in Millers Point
Italianate architecture in Sydney
Terraced houses in Sydney
1882 establishments in Australia
Houses completed in 1882
Articles incorporating text from the New South Wales State Heritage Register
Millers Point Conservation Area